= Yugavatara =

Novel by H. V. Sheshadri

- Author: H. V. Sheshadri
- Language: Kannada
- Genre: History
- Publication place: India
- Media type: Print (Paperback)

Yugavatara is a novel based on Shivaji's life story. The book is written by H. V. Sheshadri. This book got translated to Hindi and English.
